Amy Y. Tong (born October 18, 1977) is a female judoka from the United States. She competed for her native North American country at the 2000 Summer Olympics. Tong won a gold medal in the Women's Half-Heavyweight (– 78 kg) division at the 1999 Pan American Games. Tong was affiliated with the San Jose State University.

References
 

1977 births
Living people
American female judoka
Judoka at the 2000 Summer Olympics
Judoka at the 1999 Pan American Games
Olympic judoka of the United States
Sportspeople from Honolulu
Pan American Games bronze medalists for the United States
Pan American Games medalists in judo
Medalists at the 1999 Pan American Games
21st-century American women